Hardy Rafn (17 September 1930 – 23 January 1997) was a Danish film actor. He appeared in 34 films between 1956 and 1997. He was born in Slagelse, Denmark and died in Denmark.

Selected filmography
 Father of Four in the City (1956)
 Sømænd og svigermødre (1962)
 Der var engang (1966)
 Tintomara (1970)
 Me and the Mafia (1973)
 Piger i trøjen (1975)
 Eye of the Eagle (1997)

External links

1930 births
1997 deaths
Danish male film actors
People from Slagelse
20th-century Danish male actors